The Croatian Right Bloc was a Croatian political party in Bosnia and Herzegovina. On 8 August 2016, the party joined into the HSP BiH.

Croat political parties in Bosnia and Herzegovina
Croatian nationalist parties